Bonita H. Valien (1912-2011) was an African-American sociologist. She was an associate professor of Sociology at Fisk University, a historically black university in Nashville, Tennessee, and the author of several books about desegregation in the Southern United States.

Early life
Bonita Valien was born as Bonita Harrison in 1912 in Fort Worth, Texas. She graduated from Prairie View A&M University, where she earned a bachelor's degree. She subsequently earned a master's degree from Clark Atlanta University, and a PhD from the University of Wisconsin.

Career
Valien worked at Fisk University in the 1940s and 1950s. She worked as a research assistant for Charles S. Johnson, Fisk University's first president. By 1957, she was associate professor of Sociology.

Valien became the only African American to conduct research on school desegregation for the Southern Education Reporting Service, a project co-founded by Johnson and Harvie Branscomb, the chancellor of Vanderbilt University. She was "continually shortchanged of salary, resources, and responsibilities" throughout her employment. She was eventually dismissed from her position after she criticized the way some school districts were responding to Brown v. Board of Education.

Valien authored books about desegregation in St. Louis, Missouri, Clinton, Tennessee and Cairo, Illinois. With her husband, she published research about the Montgomery bus boycott and interviews with civil rights movement leader Martin Luther King Jr.

Personal life and death
Valien married Dr. Preston Valien, the chair of the Sociology department at Fisk University.

Valien died in 2011.

Selected works

References

1912 births
2011 deaths
People from Fort Worth, Texas
Prairie View A&M University alumni
Clark Atlanta University alumni
Fisk University faculty
American sociologists
American women sociologists
African-American academics
American women academics
20th-century African-American people
21st-century African-American people
20th-century African-American women
21st-century African-American women